The ABA League Players Union – VOICE is a nonprofit organization and trade union that represents ABA League basketball players.

History 
On 2 July 2020, Serbian basketball players Rade Zagorac and Nenad Miljenović established the Union in Belgrade, Serbia. In August 2020, the Union appointed Aleksandar Rašić as the general manager.

Players 

The following are lists of current players who play in the ABA League First Division and the ABA League Second Division:
 List of current ABA League First Division team rosters
 List of current ABA League Second Division team rosters

See also 
 Adriatic Basketball Association – ABA League
 National Basketball Players Association

References

External links
 

 
2020 establishments in Serbia
Non-profit organizations based in Serbia
Trade unions in Serbia
Sports trade unions